Tosca is a 1956 Italian musical melodrama film directed by Carmine Gallone and starring Franca Duval, Afro Poli and Franco Corelli. It is based on the 1900 opera Tosca by Giacomo Puccini, which was adapted from the 1887 play by Victorien Sardou. It was made at Cinecittà in Rome.

Cast
 Franca Duval as Floria Tosca
 Franco Corelli as Mario Cavaradossi
 Afro Poli as Baron Scarpia, chief of police
  as The Sacristan
 Fernando Alfieri as Spoletta, police official
 Antonio Sacchetti as Cesare Angelotti
 Aldo Corelli as Sciarrone, a gendarme
 Dino Conti as The Jailkeeper
 Maria Caniglia as Tosca (singing voice)
 Giangiacomo Guelfi as Scarpia (singing voice)

References

Bibliography
 Goble, Alan. The Complete Index to Literary Sources in Film. Walter de Gruyter, 1999.

External links

1956 films
Italian musical drama films
1950s Italian-language films
Films based on operas by Giacomo Puccini
Films based on works by Giuseppe Giacosa
Films based on La Tosca
Films directed by Carmine Gallone
Films shot at Cinecittà Studios
1950s musical drama films
Opera films
1956 drama films
1950s Italian films
Melodrama films